Tribute to Duke Ellington is a big band jazz album recorded in New York in 1999 and is the seventh recording released by the Toshiko Akiyoshi Jazz Orchestra featuring Lew Tabackin.   The first three tracks make up the "Tribute To Duke Ellington Suite" which was composed by Akiyoshi and commissioned by the Monterey Jazz Festival.

Track listing
All orchestrations by Toshiko Akiyoshi:
 "Celebration of Duke's Birth" (Akiyoshi) – 9:43
 "Eulogy" (Akiyoshi) – 10:56
 "Duke for the Ages" (Akiyoshi) – 10:25
 "Prelude to a Kiss" (Ellington, Mills, Gordon) – 10:47
 "Day Dream" (Ellington, La Touche, Strayhorn) – 6:26
 "I Let a Song Go Out of My Heart" (Ellington, Nemo, Redmond, Mills) – 6:31

Personnel
Toshiko Akiyoshi – piano
Lew Tabackin – tenor saxophone, flute
Tom Christensen  – tenor saxophone, clarinet
Dave Pietro – alto saxophone, flute
Jim Snidero – alto saxophone, flute, clarinet
Scott Robinson – baritone saxophone, alto flute, bass clarinet
John Eckert – trumpet
Andy Gravish – trumpet
Michael Ponella – trumpet
Brian Lynch – trumpet (except "Prelude to a Kiss")
Joe Magnarelli – trumpet ("Prelude to a Kiss")
Scott Whitfield – trombone
Pat Hallaran – trombone
Steve Armour – trombone
Tim Newman – bass trombone
Philippe Aerts – bass
Andy Watson – drums

Guests
Itsuro Tajima – taiko
Hiro Sasaki – kakko

References / external links
BMG Novus J BVCJ-34005

Toshiko Akiyoshi – Lew Tabackin Big Band albums
Duke Ellington tribute albums
1999 albums